Eosurcula is an extinct genus of gastropod from the Eocene of Asia, Europe, and North America.

Species 
 † Eosurcula capayana Vokes 1939
 † Eosurcula cohni Dickerson 1915
 † Eosurcula inconstans Cooper 1894 
 † Eosurcula moorei Gabb, 1860 from Bartonian in Texas
 † Eosurcula praeattenuata Gabb 1868
 † Eosurcula stena (Edwards, 1857) from Hampshire

Original description 
Genus Eosurcula was originally described by Thomas Lincoln Casey in 1904.

Casey's original text reads as follows:

References 
This article incorporates public domain text from reference.

 Fossils (Smithsonian Handbooks) by David Ward (Page 131)
 P. Jeffery and S. Tracey. 1997. The Early Eocene London Clay Formation mollusc fauna of the former Bursledon Brickworks, Lower Swanwick, Hampshire. Tertiary Research 17(3-4):75-137 
 R. L. Squires. 2001. Additions to the Eocene megafossil fauna of the Llajas Formation, Simi Valley, southern California. Contributions in Science (Natural History Museum of Los Angeles County) 489:1-40
 J. J. Sepkoski. 2002. A compendium of fossil marine animal genera. Bulletins of American Paleontology 363:1-560

External links 
Eosurcula in the Paleobiology Database

Turridae
Eocene gastropods
Paleogene gastropods of Asia
Paleogene gastropods of Europe
Paleogene gastropods of North America
Taxa named by Thomas Lincoln Casey Jr.